Meenakshi Narain (May 9, 1964 – January 1, 2023) was an Indian-born American experimental physicist. She was a Professor of Physics and Chair of the Department of Physics at Brown University, and was also Chair of the Collaboration Board of U.S. institutions in the Compact Muon Solenoid (CMS) Collaboration. She contributed to the discovery of the top quark in 1995 and Higgs Boson in 2012.

Early life and education 
Born on May 9, 1964, in Gorakhpur, Uttar Pradesh, India, Narain identified as an Asian-Indian American. She completed a B.Sc. at Gorakhpur University and a M.Sc. at IIT Kanpur. Narain earned her Ph.D. at Stony Brook University with her dissertation titled, Inclusive Photon Spectra from Upsilon States, under the supervision of Juliet Lee-Franzini.

Career 

Following her doctorate, Narain was a visiting fellow at the Laboratory of Nuclear Studies, Cornell University, and then as a post-doc at Fermi National Accelerator Laboratory from 1991–1995, where she was also a Wilson Fellow.

Narain was on the faculty of Boston University for eight years prior to joining the Brown University faculty in 2007, where she was promoted to full professor in 2010. Her research activities have included the DØ experiment at Fermilab. She was instrumental in the discovery of the top quark in 1995.

Narain participated in the CMS experiment at the Large Hadron Collider at CERN, and  contributed to the discovery Higgs Boson in 2012. She served as Chair of the Collaboration Board of U.S. institutions in the Compact Muon Solenoid (CMS) Collaboration from July 2018 to July 2022.

Narain was a frequent advocate for women in STEM fields, and she also promoted science to the general public, in events such as the WaterFire Big Bang Science Fair in Providence, Rhode Island.

Selected publications

Awards, honors 
 2000 Outstanding Junior Investigator Award, US Department of Energy.
 2000 NSF Faculty Early Career Development Award (CAREER)
 2006 Fellowship Program, Radcliffe Institute of Advanced Studies
 2007 Fellow of the American Physical Society, cited "For important contributions to the measurement of the properties of the top quark."
 2008 Career Development Award by the ADVANCE program at Brown
 2012 LHC Physics Center Fellow, Fermilab
 2020 Distinguished Alumnus Award, Indian Institute of Technology, Kanpur, India

References

External links 
  (video, 13:11 minutes)

1964 births
2023 deaths
People from Gorakhpur
American academics of Indian descent
Boston University faculty
Brown University faculty
Deen Dayal Upadhyay Gorakhpur University alumni
Experimental physicists
IIT Kanpur alumni
Stony Brook University alumni
Fellows of the American Physical Society
People associated with CERN